John Henry Light (1855–1947) was a Republican Attorney General for the state of Connecticut and Speaker of the Connecticut House of Representatives.

Early life 
Light was born in Carmel, New York in 1855, to Belden Light and Ann (Keenan) Light. He moved with his parents to New Canaan, Connecticut at a young age, and his first job was at a tannery, where he earned money to fund his education. He married Ida M. Lockwood on August 3, 1881.

Light graduated from Chamberlain Institute and Female College in New York (an early coeducational institution). Light was a schoolteacher while being instructed in the law. He passed the Connecticut bar examination in 1883 and commenced a practice in Light settled in South Norwalk, Connecticut, now part of Norwalk.

Political career 
He served as Fairfield County Treasurer from 1899 to 1906. He also served for two terms in the Connecticut House of Representatives, from 1899 and 1901, serving as speaker in 1901. Light served as a Connecticut common pleas court judge from 1901 to 1905.

On September 15, 1910, Governor Frank B. Weeks appointed him Connecticut Attorney General to fill the unexpired term of Marcus H. Holcomb. Elected to a four-year term in November 1910, he served as Attorney General until 1915.

Light was a Congregationalist. He was a Freemason and a member of the Knights Templar, Shriners, and Odd Fellows. Light was also a student of the classics noted for his extensive private library.

References

External links
Profile from The Political Graveyard
Profile from the Connecticut Attorney General's Office

1855 births
1947 deaths
Connecticut lawyers
Republican Party members of the Connecticut House of Representatives
Connecticut Attorneys General
People from Carmel, New York
People from New Canaan, Connecticut
Politicians from Norwalk, Connecticut
Speakers of the Connecticut House of Representatives